Kennesaw Mountain is a high-running ridge between Marietta and Kennesaw, Georgia in the United States.

Kennesaw Mountain may also refer to:

 Little Kennesaw Mountain, a sub-peak of Kennesaw Mountain in Georgia
 Battle of Kennesaw Mountain an 1864 American Civil War battle
 Kennesaw Mountain National Battlefield Park, a park that preserves the Kennesaw Mountain Battlefield
 Kenesaw Mountain Landis (1866–1944), American federal judge and Commissioner of Baseball
 Kennesaw Mountain High School, located in Cobb County, Georgia

See also
 Kennesaw, Georgia